The ÍBV women's football team is the women's football department of the ÍBV-íþróttafélag (English: ÍBV sports club) multi-sport club. It is based in Vestmannaeyjar, Iceland, and currently plays in the Úrvalsdeild kvenna, the top-tier women's football league in Iceland. The team plays it home games at the Hásteinsvöllur. ÍBV has won the Icelandic Cup twice, in 2004 and 2017.

History
ÍBV women's team first played in 1993, in the Icelandic second-tier 1. deild kvenna (then named 2. deild kvenna) but folded after five games. The team was back the next season and in 1996 it was promoted to Úrvalsdeild kvenna. The team folded after the 2004 season but was resurrected in 2007 when it participated in the Icelandic cup. In 2008 they participated again in 1. deild kvenna and in 2010 they won the league and got promoted back to Úrvalsdeild kvenna. In 2017 the team won its second Icelandic Cup after beating Stjarnan 3-2 in extra time. In November 2018, the club hired Jón Óli Daníelsson as its manager, replacing Ian Jeffs who joined the Icelandic women's national football team as an assistant manager.

Trophies
1. deild kvenna
Winner: 2010
Icelandic cup
Winner: 2004, 2017
Icelandic Super Cup
Winner: 2012

Former players
''For details of current and former players with a Wikipedia article, see :Category:ÍBV women's football players. They include:
 Miyah Watford in the 2020 season.

Managers
 Sveinn Sveinsson (1993)
 Miroslaw Mojsiuszko (1994–1995)
 Sigurlás Þorleifsson (1996–1998)
 Heimir Hallgrímsson (1999–2001)
 Elísabet Gunnarsdóttir (2002)
 Michelle Barr (2002)
 Heimir Hallgrímsson (2003–2004)
 Jón Ólafur Daníelsson (2007–2014)
 Ian Jeffs (2015–2018)
 Jón Óli Daníelsson  (2018–2019)
 Andri Ólafsson (2020)
 Ian Jeffs (2021)
 Jonathan Glenn (2022)
Source:

References

External links
 ÍBV Women's football Official Website

ÍBV
Capital Region (Iceland)
Úrvalsdeild Women clubs
Íþróttabandalag Vestmannaeyja